The Clerk of the Parliaments Act 1824 (5 Geo. IV c. 82) is an Act of Parliament of the United Kingdom that covers the appointment of the Clerk of the Parliaments and his deputies.

References

United Kingdom Acts of Parliament 1824
Acts of the Parliament of the United Kingdom concerning the House of Lords